Heinrich "Heinz" Hackler (14 December 1918 – 1 January 1945) was a German Luftwaffe fighter ace and recipient of the Knight's Cross of the Iron Cross during World War II. The Knight's Cross of the Iron Cross was awarded to recognise extreme battlefield bravery or successful military leadership. Heinz Hackler was listed as missing in action near Antwerp, Belgium after being hit by Allied flak during Operation Bodenplatte. Heinz Hackler was credited with 56 aerial victories.

Career
Hackler was born on 14 December 1918 in Siegen, at the time in the Province of Westphalia of the Weimar Republic. Following flight training, he was posted to the 8. Staffel (8th squadron) of Jagdgeschwader 77 (JG 77—77th Fighter Wing) in early 1941. At the time, 8. Staffel was commanded by Oberleutnant Kurt Ubben. The Staffel was subordinated to III. Gruppe (3rd group) of JG 77 which was headed by Major Alexander von Winterfeldt. In preparation for Operation Marita, the German invasion of Greece, III. Gruppe of JG 77 was moved to Deta in western Romania on 4 April 1941 and to Korinos on 19 April. That day, Hackler claimed hsi first aerial victory when he shot down a Hawker Hurricane fighter near Larissa.

Eastern Front
In preparation for Operation Barbarossa, the German invasion of the Soviet Union, III. Gruppe was moved to Bucharest and was located in the sector of Heeresgruppe Süd (Army Group South). III. Gruppe arrived in Bucharest on 16 June. Four days later, III. Gruppe moved to Roman.

On 25 September 1941, Hackler claimed his fifth aerial victory, a Mikoyan-Gurevich MiG-3 fighter in the combat area near Perekop. The next day, he became an "ace-in-a-day" claiming his aerial victories six through ten. Hackler was credited with shooting down two Polikarpov I-16 fighters, two Ilyushin Il-2 ground attack aircraft and a Petlyakov Pe-2 bomber. During the fighting along the Isthmus of Perekop on 29 September, Hackler claimed a MiG-3 fighter shot down. The next day, he claimed two I-16 fighters in the same combat area. By 27 October, the fighting has moved to the combat area south of Perekop. That day, Hackler claimed a Polikarpov I-15 and I-16 fighter.

Mediterranean Theater and Romania
On 23 October 1942, the British Eighth Army launched the Second Battle of El Alamein. Preceding this attack, the Luftwaffe had already planned to replace Jagdgeschwader 27 (JG 27—27th Fighter Wing), which had been fighting in North African theater, with JG 77. In preparation for this rotation, III. Gruppe of JG 77 was moved to Munich on 19 October where it was equipped with the Bf 109 G-2/trop. On 23 and 24 October, the Gruppe moved to Bari in southern Italy. The Gruppe then relocated to Tobruk Airfield on 26 October. The following day, the Gruppe moved to an airfield at Tanyet-Harun.

On 1 July 1944, Hackler was appointed Staffelkapitän (squadron leader) of 8. Staffel (8th squadron) of JG 77. He succeeded Leutnant Wilhelm Mockel who had temporarily replaced Hauptmann Helmut Goedert after he had been wounded in combat on 31 May. As part of the group expansion from three Staffeln per Gruppe to four Staffeln per Gruppe, Hackler's 8. Staffel was re-designated and became the 11. Staffel of JG 77 on 15 August.

Summary of career

Aerial victory claims
According to US historian David T. Zabecki, Hackler was credited with 56 aerial victories. Mathews and Foreman, authors of Luftwaffe Aces – Biographies and Victory Claims, researched the German Federal Archives and state that Hackler was credited with 37 aerial victories plus further four unconfirmed claims. This figure includes 24 claims made on the Eastern Front and 13 on the Western Front, including at least five four-engined bombers.

Victory claims were logged to a map-reference (PQ = Planquadrat), for example "PQ 5659". These sectors were then subdivided into 36 smaller units to give a location area 3 × 4 km in size.

Awards
 Honour Goblet of the Luftwaffe on 26 July 1943 as Feldwebel and pilot
 German Cross in Gold on 17 May 1943 as Oberfeldwebel in the III./Jagdgeschwader 77
 Knight's Cross of the Iron Cross on 19 August 1944 as Fahnenjunker-Oberfeldwebel and pilot in the III./Jagdgeschwader 77

Notes

References

Citations

Bibliography

 
 
 
 
 
 
 
 
 
 
 
 
 
 
 
 
 
 
 

1918 births
1945 deaths
Luftwaffe pilots
German World War II flying aces
Luftwaffe personnel killed in World War II
Missing in action of World War II
Recipients of the Gold German Cross
Recipients of the Knight's Cross of the Iron Cross
Military personnel from Siegen
Burials at Ysselsteyn German war cemetery
Aviators killed by being shot down
Aviators killed in aviation accidents or incidents in Belgium
Victims of aviation accidents or incidents in 1945